Glen Beicker Ranch Airport  is a privately owned, public use airport located 10 nautical miles (19 km) east of the central business district of Seguin, a city in Guadalupe County, Texas, United States.

Facilities 
Glen Beicker Ranch Airport covers an area of 160 acres (65 ha) at an elevation of 465 feet (142 m) above mean sea level. It has one runway designated 17/35 with a turf surface measuring 1,950 by 50 feet (594 × 15 m).

References

External links 
 Aerial image as of January 1995 from USGS The National Map

Defunct airports in Texas
Airports in Texas
Transportation in Guadalupe County, Texas